Iman Mobali (born November 3, 1982 in Izeh, Iran) is an Iranian retired football player and coach.

Club career

Foolad
Mobali joined Foolad's senior team in 2000. He was considered to be the creative dynamo of the highly talented Foolad, based in Iran's oil-rich Khuzestan province. Mobali was the key member of his team during Foolad's Iran Pro League championship. Which also secured a berth in the AFC Champions League for the first time in club history.

Al-Shabab
In 2005 Mobali signed a contract with Al-Shabab in the UAE League. In his first season, he scored 6 times in 15 appearances. In the following season Mobali was hit with a series of injuries and only managed to make 11 league appearances. In his last year with Al-Shabab he had his best year, he scored 9 goals in 19 appearances and Al-Shabab won the league title.

Al Wasl & Al Nasr
In summer 2008 he signed a contract with the UAE giants, Al Wasl. In his one and only season with the club, Mobali scored 7 times in 19 appearances. He left the club at the end of the season. He signed for Al Nasr in summer 2009. After an unsuccessful season with Al Nasr, Mobali decided not to extend his contract and returned to Iran.

Esteghlal
Mobali signed a one-year contract with Esteghlal in the spring of 2010. He made 36 total appearances and did not manage to score a goal. He left the club at the end of the season and signed with UAE club Al Sharjah. He only made 8 appearances before leaving the club.

Paykan
After his stint in Sharjah, Mobali again returned to the Iran Pro League and again returned to Tehran; this time he signed with Paykan in the summer of 2012. He scored twice in 25 appearances but was unable to help Paykan from getting relegated to the Azadegan League.

Esteghlal Khuzestan
After Paykan was relegated, Mobali left the team and joined newly promoted club Esteghlal Khuzestan. He made 25 appearances and scored twice before being loaned out to his former club Esteghlal. He made 4 appearances with Esteghlal before season's end.

Naft Tehran
In summer of 2014, Mobali signed a two-year contract with Naft Tehran. He finished the 2014–15 season with 13 assists, most in the league. On 1 July 2015 Mobali extended his contract with Naft Tehran for one more year.

Club career statistics

 Assist Goals

International career
At international level Mobali is considered one of Asia's brightest prospects. Mobali made his debut for Team Melli in January 2001 against China. He was among Iran's under-23 squad in 2002, winning a Gold Medal in the Busan Asian Games.

2011 Asian Cup
Mobali started most of the matches in the group stage for Team Melli in 2011 AFC Asian Cup, and scored a beautiful goal in a match against Iraq from a curling free-kick.

International goals
Scores and results list Iran's goal tally first.

Awards and honours

Club
Foolad
Iran Pro League (1) : 2004–05

Al-Shabab
UAE Pro League (1) : 2007–08

Naft Tehran
Hazfi Cup (1): 2016–17

Country
Iran U-23
Asian Games (1) : 2002

Iran
WAFF (1) : 2004
Asian Cup : 2004 Third Place

Individual
Persian Gulf Pro League Top Assistant (1): 2014–15

External links

Iman Mobali at TeamMelli.com
 

1982 births
Living people
Iranian footballers
Iran international footballers
Association football midfielders
Esteghlal F.C. players
Foolad FC players
Al Shabab Al Arabi Club Dubai players
Iranian expatriate footballers
People from Izeh
Niroye Zamini players
Al-Wasl F.C. players
Sharjah FC players
Esteghlal Khuzestan players
Naft Tehran F.C. players
Iranian expatriate sportspeople in the United Arab Emirates
Expatriate footballers in the United Arab Emirates
2004 AFC Asian Cup players
2007 AFC Asian Cup players
2011 AFC Asian Cup players
Asian Games gold medalists for Iran
Persian Gulf Pro League players
Azadegan League players
UAE Pro League players
Al-Nasr SC (Dubai) players
Asian Games medalists in football
Footballers at the 2002 Asian Games
Medalists at the 2002 Asian Games
Sportspeople from Khuzestan province